Michael D. Ratliff (born June 7, 1951) was an American former basketball player in the National Basketball Association (NBA). He played with the Kansas City-Omaha Kings. Ratliff attended William Horlick High School in Racine, Wisconsin and the University of Wisconsin–Eau Claire.

References

NBA.com playerfile

1951 births
Living people
American expatriate basketball people in France
American men's basketball players
Basketball players from Mississippi
Basketball players from Wisconsin
Centers (basketball)
Grand Rapids Hoops players
Kansas City Kings draft picks
Kansas City Kings players
People from New Albany, Mississippi
Sportspeople from Racine, Wisconsin
Wisconsin–Eau Claire Blugolds men's basketball players
American expatriate basketball people in Italy
Alsace de Bagnolet players
William Horlick High School alumni